The 11th Syracuse Grand Prix was a motor race, run to Formula One rules, held on 25 April 1961 at Syracuse Circuit, Sicily. The race was run over 56 laps of the circuit, and was won by Italian driver Giancarlo Baghetti in a Ferrari 156 in his first Formula One race, the only driver to achieve this feat. Baghetti went on to win his next two Formula One races, including his first World Championship race.

Results

References
 "The Grand Prix Who's Who", Steve Small, 1995.
 "The Formula One Record Book", John Thompson, 1974.
 Race results at www.silhouet.com 

Syracuse Grand Prix
Syracuse Grand Prix
Syracuse Grand Prix
Syracuse Grand Prix